Crossroads Mall was an enclosed shopping mall located in Omaha, Nebraska, United States, at the intersection of 72nd and Dodge Streets. Originally opened in 1960 by Omaha's Brandeis department store, the mall has been home to several major chains, including Sears, Target and Dillard's before the store closed in 2008. The mall is now demolished, and is expected to be redeveloped as a mixed-use center, called The Crossroads, in 2024.

History

Beginnings
In the late 1950s, Brandeis Investment Co., the real estate division of the local Brandeis department store, obtained a 96-year lease on land at the northwest corner of 72nd and Dodge streets for a new shopping center. Construction started in September 1959, and the mall opened in September 1960 as "Crossroads Shopping Center", a single-story straight corridor  between the two anchor stores: Sears at the west and Brandeis at the east.  Both Sears and Brandeis were 3 stories: the first floor of each is actually the basement level of the mall, but had exterior access for the anchors; the second floor (originally called the "Arcade Level") opens into the mall; there was no mall or exterior access to the third floor of either anchor store.

Renovation
Melvin Simon & Associates purchased the mall in 1984. A $35 million renovation project began in 1986 and was completed in 1988.  The renovation created a new 2-story center court with a unique white membrane "tent" roof extending far above the 2nd floor (Simon added a similar tent roof at University Mall in Little Rock, Arkansas, around the same time).  The 2nd floor of the center court housed the food court.  A new wing running perpendicular to the original corridor to the north added 2 floors of retail space with Dillard's as a new anchor at the north end. William Dillard, the founder and president of the Dillard's chain was present at the opening of the store at Crossroads. A new single-story wing extended south from the center court and ended at a large glass-enclosed main entrance.  The renovation also added a 6-story parking structure on the northeast corner of the property, which connected to the 2nd floor of the new north wing, to the 2nd and 3rd floors of the new Dillard's store, and originally connected to the 3rd floor of the existing Younkers store, all via enclosed skywalks.  Unlike the original anchors, the first and second floors of Dillard's matched up with the first and second floors of the mall.  The entire mall was refurbished during the renovation, updated with a bold new red, blue, and gray color scheme and new neon lighting.  Also around the same time as this renovation, Sears added a passenger elevator, where previously only escalators had been available to customers.

Second Renovation
In 1998, the mall underwent a smaller, mostly cosmetic remodel in which the color scheme and furnishings were updated to more neutral colors.  New directional signage was added in the mall and the parking garage, and a large lighted "FOOD COURT" sign was added over the escalator leading up to the food court.  Spaces of two former food court tenants were combined and remodeled to provide additional seating, small children's rides, and a family restroom.  The main south entrance was also updated with a new "compass" logo, new logotype, and faux windows above the existing windows.

2005-2013
In early 2005, Younkers closed its store, and the building was demolished to make way for a new Target store which opened in July, 2006.  Despite speculation that the new Target would be two floors like some of its other urban locations (such as downtown Minneapolis), the new store has one level of retail space with entrances to the south surface parking lot and into the mall.  The receiving and storage areas for the store are on a separate level below the retail space and not accessible to customers.  Unlike the former Younkers space, the Target store is not connected to the parking garage.  Instead, the skywalk that used to open into Younkers now leads to a new stairway down to the mall level in an expanded entrance north of Target's mall entrance.

In December 2007, Dillard's announced that its Crossroads store would become a Dillard's Clearance Center, selling clearance merchandise from area Dillard's stores and other lower-priced items.
The Dillard's anchor was closed in August 2008. By the spring of 2009, the entire second level, including the food court, had become completely vacant. Around this time, both the escalators and the North Wing was walled off, since it was entirely vacant. In the mall's later years, this wing was used for event space.

By the late 2000s, the mall was struggling. The larger Westroads (less than three miles (5 km) away) and Oak View Malls, as well as the "lifestyle centers" Village Pointe and Shadow Lake were drawing customers away from Crossroads. Nearly 50 percent of the mall was vacant around this time. In mid-June 2009, Simon Malls announced that Crossroads was for sale. Simon did not announce the price of the property, however in 2002, the mall was appraised at approximately $57 million. Ideas for redevelopment of Crossroads included a complex for residential and commercial.

Having received several bids for the mall that were deemed too low, Simon Property Group defaulted on their mortgage payments, sending the mall into foreclosure.  A foreclosure sale by the lender was scheduled on March 4, 2010.<ref
 name="CrossroadsSale2"></ref>

The mall changed hands that March, going to CW Capital for $40.6 million, who turned around and sold it in June 2010 for an undisclosed amount.<ref
 name="CrossroadsSale3"></ref> Century Development was the current owner, who displayed a strong concern for taking the mall in the right direction for Omaha.<ref
 name="CrossroadsSale4"></ref>

After the sale, two of the mall's bays on the East wing next to Target were occupied by Restoration Church. The Mall also housed many small unique businesses like Sissy's Bags Boutique, ReJenerations, Stella's, Dragon Storm Kempo Karate, Pro Nails, Battle Bears, D&B Auction House, Diverse Cutz Barber Shop, Fairytail Costumes, and Wireless Solutions. It also had a few chain stores like Barnes & Noble, which remained as a junior anchor until April 2020.

Closing and demolition
As of February 2016, both Foot Locker and Finished had closed, with Restoration Church having moved to the latter's bay. Other bays around the mall became occupied by new tenants, including: Fairytail Costumes and Rental, Diverse Cutz, Cinderella's Closet, 1/2 of 1/2 Name Brand Clothing, Om Eyebrow Threading, The Czech and Slovak Educational Center and Museum, The Great Plains Black History Museum, PART (Performing Artists Repertory Theatre), and Pishon Boutique. The Mall hosted semi-annual events like "Nebraska's Largest Indoor Garage Sale," Take 2 Kids Consignment, and AARP Tax Services. The third level of the Sears store was closed off. In 2016, Target permanently sealed off its mall entrance.

Century Development announced a plan in 2015 to begin demolition on the mall except for Target and a parking garage, as well as a parcel to the west of the mall. The developers planned to seek tax incentives through the Nebraska Legislature. This plan did not come to fruition.

On December 28, 2018, Sears announced that its store at the mall would be closing in March 2019 as part of a plan to close 80 stores nationwide, which left Target as the only operating anchor. 

On April 7, 2020, it was announced again that Crossroads Mall was to be demolished, and that tenants would have 30 days to move. The demolition was to begin in May, however, the deadline was missed. The Barnes & Noble closed on April 25, 2020. The mall itself closed around September 2020.

On August 5, 2020, Century Development and new partner Lockwood Development announced a new redevelopment plan for the mall site. The Target and the existing parking garage will remain (albeit remodeled), but the rest of the mall's structure will be demolished. A property immediately west of the mall that had been built in 1967 as a Gulf Mart discount store  and was later home to other retailers including Best Buy and a Bag 'n Save, plus an Applebee's restaurant just south of the former mall's entrance that was facing Dodge Street, would also be cleared. In its place will stand 150,000 square feet of entertainment/lifestyle, 200,000 square feet of retail, 150 hotel rooms, 400 residences, up to 500,000 square feet of office space, and a "signature" pavilion, totaling around 1.5 million square feet. This area will be dubbed The Crossroads, and its construction will be complete some time in 2024.

On December 9, 2020, demolition of Crossroads Mall began on the former Sears Auto Center.

Design
Crossroads was an enclosed mall with 2 levels of retail space.  A third level (basement) housed the mall management office.  The mall featured a 2nd level food court that overlooked the center court and was housed under a unique large white membrane "tent" with 2 peaks. However, the food court was closed around 2008 and no stores were open on the second floor, so this floor had been closed.  The north wing had large skylights running the entire length of the corridor, while the east, west, and south wings did not have natural lighting.

References

External links
 Vintage Crossroads Mall postcard @ Malls of America
 Omaha City Weekly article 'At a Crossroads'
 "Lincoln Journal Star" article 'Crossroads Mall in Omaha sold to Century Development'
 Omaha by Design vision for Crossroads area

Shopping malls in Omaha, Nebraska
Defunct shopping malls in the United States
Demolished shopping malls in the United States
Shopping malls established in 1960
Shopping malls disestablished in 2020